Journal of Rheology is a peer-reviewed scientific journal publishing original (primary) research on all aspects of rheology, the study of those properties of materials which determine their response to mechanical force. It is published bi-monthly by the Society of Rheology through the American Institute of Physics. 

The editor-in-chief of Journal of Rheology is Dimitris Vlassopoulos.

Publication history
The publication of Journal of Rheology has seen three phases.  The journal was first published as Journal of Rheology between 1929 and 1932.  In 1933 the journal was subsumed as a section (called Rheology Numbers) of the journal Physics, and then the Journal of Applied Physics.  From 1957, the Society of Rheology reestablished the journal as a separate publication, initially named Transactions of the Society of Rheology, renamed Journal of Rheology from 1977.

Abstracting and indexing 
Journal of Rheology is abstracted and indexed in the following databases:
 Chemical Abstracts Service – CASSI
 Science Citation Index – Web of Science
 Engineering Index
 Applied Mechanics Reviews
 RAPRA Abstracts
 Physics Abstracts
 SPIN

See also 

 Journal of Applied Physics
 List of scientific journals in physics

References

External links 
 
  Society of Rheology homepage

Physics journals
American Institute of Physics academic journals
Publications established in 1929
English-language journals
Bimonthly journals
Fluid dynamics journals